The Dominican city of Santa Cruz de Mao, or simply Mao, is the head municipality of the Valverde province, in the northwest of the country.

It is the largest city of the Dominican northwest and the centre of the region. Its name, a Taíno word, comes from the River Mao, near the city. Its nickname is Ciudad de los Bellos Atardeceres (English, "City of the Beautiful Sunsets"); this was given by Juan De Jesus Reyes, renowned poet and Dominican literary icon. There are no mountains to the west of the city and it is common to see a "red" sky at sunset; it is a very dry region and there is much dust in the air which gives the sky a red color.

History
For most of its history, the region was called "El Despoblado"; that means a region without any population, because it is a very dry region and agriculture was not possible.

When the governor of the Spanish colony gave the order in 1606 that everybody living on the northern coast had to move inland, some people came to live around the present Mao. They had cattle that were raised in hatos. "Hato" means a large farm for raising cattle (a ranch), and so the names of many places around Mao derive from the word: Hatico, Hato del Yaque, Hato Nuevo, Hato Viejo, Hato del Medio.

The town of Mao was built close to where the River Mao flows into the River Yaque del Norte. The first Catholic church was built in 1869.

The town was made a Puesto Cantonal (an old category similar to the present Municipal District under a military government). Mao was elevated to the category of municipality in 1882, and in 1904 its official name was changed to "Valverde" after José Desiderio Valverde, former President of the Dominican Republic. Because the name Mao was known by everybody and Valverde was a new name, people called the city "Valverde (Mao)", and it is still common to say so.

When the province was created in 1959, Mao was made its head municipality and provincial capital.

Climate
Unlike the humid northern coast of the Dominican Republic, Mao is located in a sheltered valley and like the southern coastal fringe of Hispaniola, has a hot semi-arid climate (Köppen BSh), with the temperature being warm year-round and some months being wetter than others. Mao receives  of rainfall annually over 60.8 precipitation days. The driest month is January, which receives  of rain on average, and the wettest month is May, which receives  of rainfall on average. May also has the most precipitation days of any month (9.3) and July has the least (2.5).

Economy

The main economic activity of the province is agriculture; the main products in the municipality are rice, bananas and plantain.

Notable people
 Monica Boyar (1920–2013), Dominican-born American singer

References

Populated places in Valverde Province
Municipalities of the Dominican Republic